The 2022 European Youth & U15 Weightlifting Championships (European Youth & Cadet Weightlifting Championships (U15 & U17 European Weightlifting Championships)) took place in Raszyn, Poland from 10 to 17 August 2022. It was the 19th edition of the European Youth Championships and 9th edition of the European U15 Championships.

Championships (Youth & Cadet)

 Main Article : European Youth & Cadet Weightlifting Championships (U15 & U17 European Weightlifting Championships)

Youth (Youth17/Youth16)

Cadet (Youth15)

Medalists 
Results Book:

Youth

Boys

Girls

U15

Boys

Girls

Medal table

Big medals

All medals

References

External links 
European Weightlifting Federation
Polski Związek Podnoszenia Ciężarów

European Youth and U15 Weightlifting Championships
August 2022 sports events in Poland
International weightlifting competitions hosted by Poland
European Youth and U15 Weightlifting Championships